Vera Ivanovna Krasnova (born 3 April 1950) is a retired Russian speed skater who specialized in the 500 m distance. She competed at the 1972 and 1976 Winter Olympics and won a silver medal in 1972, placing fifth in 1976.

Krasnova won a silver medal in the 500 m at the 1972 European All-around Championships. She took part in five World Sprint Speed Skating Championships, with the best result of fourth place in 1975. Domestically she won the 500 m Soviet title in 1969, 1972 and 1976. Krasnova was born in Omsk, but later moved to Moscow and worked there as a school teacher.

References

1950 births
Living people
Soviet female speed skaters
Olympic speed skaters of the Soviet Union
Speed skaters at the 1972 Winter Olympics
Speed skaters at the 1976 Winter Olympics
Olympic silver medalists for the Soviet Union
Olympic medalists in speed skating
Russian female speed skaters

Medalists at the 1972 Winter Olympics